Public Warning is the first studio album by English hip hop artist Lady Sovereign, released on 31 October 2006. Was originally due for release in November 2005 but was pushed back after Lady Sovereign was signed by Island Def Jam.

In a July 2006 press release, the album's track listing was confirmed. Public Warning features Lady Sovereign's three past singles, tracks from her two EPs: Vertically Challenged and Blah Blah, as well as newly recorded tracks for the release, including "Love Me or Hate Me" and "Those Were the Days". The album was released in the U.K. on 5 February 2007, with a live cover of the Sex Pistols' "Pretty Vacant" as a bonus track.

Public Warning received generally positive reviews from critics, who praised the production and lyrical content for carrying both humor and substance. The album sold over 125,000 copies in the United States  and sold 250,000 copies worldwide.

Critical reception

Public Warning received generally positive reviews from music critics. At Metacritic, which assigns a normalised rating out of 100 to reviews from mainstream critics, the album has received an average score of 67, based on 34 reviews.

AllMusic editor David Jeffries praised the album for Medasyn's production and Sovereign's lyrical content for being relatable, calling it "an exciting introduction to an extraordinary artist captured at just the right time." Michaelangelo Matos of The A.V. Club compared the album to The Sex Pistols, praising tracks like "Tango" and "Hoodie" for their angst-filled energy, saying "Even if Sov doesn't cross over the way she or Def Jam might want her to, she still sounds like an original—even for people who know half the songs already." Mike Diver of Drowned in Sound praised the album for having solid production and lyrical content that's both gritty and humorous, saying "When her tongue's in cheek and her rhymes amuse, Lady Sovereign is hugely entertaining."

Michael Endelman of Entertainment Weekly found criticism in the album's overly frenetic beats and out-of-tune choruses but praised Sovereign for her humor and lyrical flow, saying that her "rubbery rhymes and punky energy are definitely entertaining, and well worth sampling in moderate doses." Steve 'Flash' Juon of RapReviews commented that Sovereign's heavily accented lyrics and electronic beats can get abrasive at times but said the album has crossover potential because of her flow and humor that requires little British familiarity.

The album also received negative reception from critics. Alex Macpherson of The Guardian commented on Sovereign's talent being wasted on hollow content and production that moved towards ska-punk than grime, calling it "the sound of a fantastic artist seemingly intent on compromising all her strengths." Baz Dreisinger of The Village Voice compared Sovereign to Eminem, commenting on the catchy choruses, juvenile humor and one-liners throughout the album but felt that it lacked character and substance to match the comparison. The most critical of the album was Al Shipley of Stylus Magazine, who heavily criticized the botched humor, synthpop production and Sovereign's lyrical flow, saying that she "simulates the altogether new and horrible experience of hearing Eliza Doolittle rap."

Rolling Stone ranked the album number 48 on its list of Best Albums of 2006.

Censored version
A censored version was also released that used backmasking and sound effects over the profanities. The album booklet still has all the lyrics written out, but the profanities are starred over.

Track listing

 The enhanced CD contains a link to a 15-minute documentary

Charts and certifications

Release history

References

2006 debut albums
Lady Sovereign albums
Def Jam Recordings albums
Albums produced by Dr. Luke